Beacon Pictures (aka Beacon Communications, LLC) is an American film production and international sales company founded in 1990 by Armyan Bernstein, who is also its chairman. The company produces motion pictures for studios such as Walt Disney Studios Motion Pictures, Universal Pictures and Sony Pictures Entertainment. In 1996, it struck a first look deal with Universal.

Beacon was acquired in 1994 by COMSAT, who a year later put the company under its Ascent Entertainment Group division. By early 1999, Ascent was about to be broken up due to financial problems, mostly stemming from building the Pepsi Center in Denver. Bernstein and venture capitalist Kevin O Donnell, son of Kennedy Administration Kenny O'Donnell, purchased Beacon back, restoring its independent company status.

Films
The Commitments (1991) With 20th Century Fox
A Midnight Clear (1992) With InterStar Releasing and A&M Films
A Life in the Theatre (1993) With TNT
Sugar Hill (1993) With 20th Century Fox
Princess Caraboo (1994) With TriStar Pictures
The Road to Wellville (1994) With Columbia Pictures
The Baby-Sitters Club (1995) With Columbia Pictures and Scholastic
The Van (1996) With Fox Searchlight Pictures and BBC Films
Air Force One (1997) With Columbia Pictures and Touchstone Pictures
A Thousand Acres (1997) With Touchstone Pictures, PolyGram Filmed Entertainment and Propaganda Films
Playing God (1997) With Touchstone Pictures
Disturbing Behavior (1998) With Metro-Goldwyn-Mayer, Hoyts Distribution and Village Roadshow Pictures
Trippin' (1999) With Rogue Pictures
For Love of the Game (1999) With Universal Pictures, Tig Productions and Mirage Enterprises
The Hurricane (1999) With Universal Pictures
End of Days (1999) With Universal Pictures
Duets (2000) With Hollywood Pictures and Seven Arts Pictures
The Family Man (2000) With Universal Pictures and Saturn Films
Bring It On (2000) With Universal Pictures
Thirteen Days (2000) With New Line Cinema
Spy Game (2001) With Universal Pictures, Kalima Productions Gmbh & Co. kg, Red Wagon Entertainment and Toho-Towa
Tuck Everlasting (2002) With Walt Disney Pictures and Scholastic
The Emperor's Club (2002) With Universal Pictures, Fine Line Features and Sidney Kimmel Entertainment
Open Range (2003) With Touchstone Pictures and Tig Productions
Ladder 49 (2004) With Touchstone Pictures and Casey Silver Productions
Bring It On Again (2004) With Universal Pictures
Raising Helen (2004) With Touchstone Pictures, Mandeville Films and Hyde Park Entertainment
A Lot like Love (2005) With Touchstone Pictures
Bring it on: All or Nothing (2006) With Universal Pictures
Firewall (2006) With Warner Bros. Pictures, Village Roadshow Pictures and Thunder Road Pictures
The Guardian (2006) With Touchstone Pictures and Flash Film WorksChildren of Men (2006) With Universal Pictures, Strike Entertainment and Toho-TowaPu-239 (2006) With HBO Films and Section Eight ProductionsUncle P (2007) With New Line CinemaBring It On: In It to Win It (2007) With Universal PicturesThe Water Horse: Legend of the Deep (2007) With Columbia Pictures, Revolution Studios and Walden MediaBring It On: Fight to the Finish (2009) With Universal PicturesMardi Gras: Spring Break (2011) With Samuel Goldwyn Films and Screen GemsGrey Lady (2015) With Broadvision Pictures and Anchor Bay FilmsBring It On: Worldwide Cheersmack (2017) With Universal PicturesBring It On: Cheer or Die (2022) with Universal 1440 Entertainment and Syfy                             
  Soul Plane (2004) With Metro Goldwyn Mayer
                                                          
            
                                                        .

TelevisionThe Earth Day Special (1990) with Warner Bros. TelevisionNY-LON (2008) with CBSCastle (2009–16) with Disney-ABC Domestic TelevisionAgent X'' (2015) with Warner Bros. Television and TNT

References

External links
 

Film production companies of the United States
Companies based in Santa Monica, California
Mass media companies established in 1990
1990 establishments in California
1994 mergers and acquisitions
1999 mergers and acquisitions
International sales agents